Father Steps Out is a 1937 British comedy film directed by Maclean Rogers and starring George Carney, Dinah Sheridan, Bruce Seton and Peter Gawthorne. Wealthy cheese manufacturer Joe Hardcastle (George Carney) falls prey to a gang of con men, but is rescued in the nick of time by his chauffeur (Bruce Seton).

Cast
 George Carney - Joe Hardcastle
 Bruce Seton - Johnnie Miller
 Dinah Sheridan - Helen Hardcastle
 Peter Gawthorne - Mr Fitzwilliam
 Vivienne Chatterton - Mrs Hardcastle
 Basil Langton - Philip Fitzwilliam
 Zillah Bateman - Mrs Fitzwilliam
 Elizabeth Kent - Joan
 Isobel Scaife - Alice

References

External links

1937 films
Films directed by Maclean Rogers
1937 comedy films
British comedy films
British black-and-white films
1930s English-language films
1930s British films